Peter Wyper (1861 in Lanarkshire, Scotland – 1920) was a player of the diatonic button accordion (or melodeon), and is believed to be the first person to ever be recorded playing the accordion, which he did on wax cylinder in 1903. Peter and his brother Daniel Wyper (b. 1872) recorded together as the Wyper Brothers, performing Scottish and Irish music.

Discography

Highland Schottische (July 1909, 78rpm)
Selection of Hornpipes (Columbia Records, 78rpm)
Selection of Jigs  (Columbia Records, 78rpm)
The Deil Among The Tailors/High Level Hornpipe(Regal Records, G6952, 78rpm)
Stirling Castle/Flowers of Edinburgh (Regal Records, G6959, 78rpm)
Eightsome Reel/Mary of Argyle (Solo) and Jenkin's Hornpipe (Regal Records, G6985, 78rpm)
Selection of Irish Airs/Selection of Irish Dances  (Regal Records, G6975, 78rpm)

Bibliography
Wyper's Melodeon Tutor for 19-Keys

References

External links
 
Peter and Daniel Wyper. Keith Chandler, Box and Fiddle Archive
Early Recordings of Traditional Dance Music: Peter and Daniel Wyper Champion Melodeon Players of Scotland. Keith Chandler - 24.12.9

Scottish accordionists
1861 births
1920 deaths